Outthilath Nammakhoth (born 13 September 1996) is a Laotian professional footballer currently playing as a goalkeeper.football playing for Young Elephant F.C. in Lao League 1 season 2022

Career statistics

International

References

1996 births
Living people
Laotian footballers
Laotian expatriate footballers
Laos international footballers
Association football goalkeepers
Expatriate footballers in Vietnam
Hoang Anh Gia Lai FC players
V.League 1 players
Lao Toyota F.C. players
Outthilath Nammakhoth
Expatriate footballers in Thailand
Laotian expatriate sportspeople in Thailand